The Association of German Banks (BdB or Bankenverband) is the association of commercial banks in Germany and a key lobby group for Germany's financial sector. It was founded in 1951 in Cologne as an Eingetragener Verein, succeeding the pre-war  (1901-1945). In 1999 it moved to Berlin, while its the publishing subsidiary Bankverlag remained in Cologne. The association also maintains an office in Brussels. 

The BdB is a member of the German Banking Industry Committee that brings it together with its peers representing the other segments or "pillars" of German banking, namely the BVR for cooperative banks, the DSGV for savings banks, the VÖB mainly for public promotional banks, and VdP for specialized mortgage banks. The BdB is also a member of the European Banking Federation.

Membership

BdB represents the joint interests of around 210 private commercial banks and 11 member associations. 

The 11 regional associations are: Bankenverband Baden-Württemberg e.V., Bankenverband Bremen e.V., Bankenverband Hamburg e.V., Bankenverband Hessen e.V., Bankenverband Niedersachsen e.V., Bankenverband Rheinland-Pfalz e.V., Bankenverband Saarland e.V., Bankenverband Schleswig-Holstein e.V., Bankenvereinigung Nordrhein-Westfalen e.V., Bayerischer Bankenverband e.V., and Ostdeutscher Bankenverband e.V. (OstBV) which represents Berlin and the five so-called new states.

Deposit guarantee schemes

The BdB manages two separate but interrelated deposit guarantee schemes. 

 The BdB's statutory deposit guarantee scheme (EdB) insures deposits up to the harmonized European limit of €100,000 per account, in line with the EU Deposit Guarantee Scheme Directive (DGSD).

 The BdB's additional or "top-up" deposit guarantee fund provides deposit guarantee in addition to that of the EdB, up to 5 million euro for individuals and 50 million for corporate entities. These levels are expected to be gradually reduced over the years to reach 1 million and 10 million respectively by 2030.

Auditing Association

The Auditing Association of German Banks (PdB), established in 1969 in Cologne, is a sister entity to the BdB and is tasked with assessing the risk of each participating BdB member which feeds into the calculation of EdB and ESF deposit guarantee fees. It is led by a 3-members management board.

Leadership

The BdB is led by an executive board or Vorstand. The three large banks (namely Deutsche Bank, Commerzbank, and Hypovereinsbank) each nominate one member; the small privately owned banks (Privatbankiers) collectively have two seats; the second-tier commercial banks known as regional banks have four seats; and the foreign banks (other than Italian-owned Hypovereinsbank) have one seat. Ex officio, the General Manager of the BdB is also a member of the Vorstand. 

The board elects a President along with two alternates, which together form the Präsidium. By tradition, the President role should be held alternating between the big banks and the other members of private and regional banks, but that rule is not followed strictly.

The daily business is led by the collective Management Board, which is led by the General Manager.

Presidents
 1951–1960 Robert Pferdmenges (Sal. Oppenheim)
 1960–1967  (HSBC Trinkaus)
 1968–1975  (Schröder, Münchmeyer, Hengst & Co.)
 1975–1979 Wilhelm Christians (Deutsche Bank)
 1979–1983  (Sal. Oppenheim)
 1983–1987  (BHF-Bank)
 1987–1991  (Dresdner Bank)
 1991–1994  (Bayerische Hypotheken- und Wechselbank)
 1994–1997 Karl-Heinz Wessel (Sal. Oppenheim)
 1997–2000  (Commerzbank)
 2000–2001 Frank Heintzeler
 2001–2005  (Deutsche Bank)
 2005–2009 Klaus-Peter Müller (Commerzbank)
 2009-2013 Andreas Schmitz (HSBC Trinkaus)
 2013–2016 Jürgen Fitschen (Deutsche Bank)
 2016–April 2020 and August 2020-June 2021: Hans-Walter Peters (Berenberg Bank)
 April-August 2020: Martin Zielke (Commerzbank)
 July 2021-: Christian Sewing (Deutsche Bank)

General Managers
 , 1966-1992
 , 1992-2010
 , 2010-2017
 , 2018-2022 
 Christian Ossig, 2018-2023 (jointly with Krautscheid until early 2022)
 Heiner Herkenhoff, from April 2023

Controversy

From 2016 until 2017, a parliamentary fact-finding committee probed BdB’s potential involvement in tax fraud involving multi-billion-euro trades to get bogus tax reclaims, following the revelations by the CumEx Files; however, the probe proved unable to access emails and documents from BdB. In 2020, public prosecutors on raided the Berlin and Frankfurt offices of BdB as part of a similar investigation.

See also
 Fédération Bancaire Française
 Associazione Bancaria Italiana

Notes

External links 

 Bundesverband deutscher Banken
 

Banking in Germany
Bankers associations
Organisations based in Berlin
Lobbying in Germany